Trydarssus is a genus of South American jumping spiders that was first described by María Elena Galiano in 1995.  it contains only two species that are found in Argentina, Paraguay, and Chile: T. nobilitatus and T. pantherinus.

References

Salticidae genera
Salticidae
Spiders of South America